Clémont is a commune in the Cher department in the Centre-Val de Loire region of France.

Geography
The commune borders the department of Loiret.

Population

Sights
 The church of St. Etienne, dating from the nineteenth century.
 The chateau of Lauroy, dating from the seventeenth century.

See also
Communes of the Cher department

References

Communes of Cher (department)